Cryosophila guagara is a species of flowering plant in the family Arecaceae. It is found in Costa Rica and Panama. It is threatened by habitat loss.

References

guagara
Flora of Costa Rica
Flora of Panama
Near threatened plants
Taxonomy articles created by Polbot